Selah Reeve Hobbie (March 10, 1797 – March 23, 1854) was an American lawyer and politician who served one term as a U.S. Representative from New York from 1827 to 1829.

Biography 
Born in Newburgh, New York, Hobbie studied law.
He was admitted to the bar and commenced practice in Delhi, New York.

Career 
He served as district attorney of Delaware County 1823–1827.
He served as member of the State assembly 1827–1829.
He served in the militia as brigade major and inspector.

Congress 
Hobbie was elected as a Jacksonian to the Twentieth Congress (March 4, 1827 – March 3, 1829).

Later career and death 
He was appointed Assistant Postmaster General and served from 1829 until 1851, when he resigned on account of ill health.
He was appointed First Assistant Postmaster General and served from March 22, 1853, until his death in Washington, D.C., March 23, 1854.

He was interred in Congressional Cemetery, Washington, D.C., on March 26, 1854.

Sources

1797 births
1854 deaths
Burials at the Congressional Cemetery
American militia officers
Jacksonian members of the United States House of Representatives from New York (state)
19th-century American politicians

Members of the United States House of Representatives from New York (state)